The Bollock Brothers are a British punk act formed in 1979 by the London promoter, DJ, and manager Jock McDonald. They are best known for their English language cover of Serge Gainsbourg's song "Harley David (Son of a Bitch)" (originally in French) and Alex Harvey's "Faith Healer".

As well as being known for their original songs "Horror Movies", "The Bunker", "The Legend Of The Snake" and "The Slow Removal of The Left Ear of Vincent van Gogh" which featured Martin Glover of the band Killing Joke, they are known for their release of cover versions by artists Led Zeppelin, The Sensational Alex Harvey Band, Steppenwolf, David Bowie, and Vangelis among others.

Their 1983 electro version of the Sex Pistols' album Never Mind The Bollocks featured Michael Fagan, the man who entered the Queen's bedchamber at Buckingham Palace. Jimmy Lydon, brother of Johnny Rotten, was a featured vocalist for a short period in the early 1980s.

In 1994, Croydon-based DJ Andy Hubbard aka, "Alby" remixed "Faith Healer" at the Alaska Studios in Waterloo, London. The record was never released, and the original DAT copy was held by Jock McDonald. Andy Hubbard also replaced the original keyboard player for a gig later that year in Wuppertal, Germany.

Having released nine studio albums as well as other EPs, singles, live releases, and compilations, the band continues to play music throughout Europe primarily in Belgium, Germany, and France.

Discography

Studio albums
 The Last Supper (Charly) March 1983
 Never Mind the Bollocks 1983 (Charly) August 1983
 The 4 Horsemen of the Apocalypse (Charly) 1985
 The Prophecies of Nostradamus (Blue Turtle) December 1987
 Mythology (Blue Turtle) February 1989
 The Dead Sea Scrolls (SPV) September 1991 (as the Famous B. Brothers)
 Blood, Sweat and Beers (GUN) July 1996
 Last Will and Testament (MBC) March 2009

Live albums
 Live Performances (Charly) January 1984
 In Private in Public (Charly) December 1986 (as the Famous Bollock Brothers)
 Live & Dangerous (MBC) March 2012
 10 in a Row, Here We Go – Live at Coesfeld Fabrik (EmuBands), September 2013

Singles
 "One of the Lads (Island) November 1979 (as 4" Be 2")
 "Frustration" (WEA) 27 June 1980 (as 4" Be 2")
 "The Bunker" (McDonald Lydon, re-released 1983 by Charly) October 1980
 "Good Old Arsenal (AFC)" November 1980 (as the Sex Bristols)
 "Why Won't Rangers Sign a Catholic?" (no label) 1980 (as Pope Paul and the Romans)
 "The Act Became Real" (McDonald and Lydon) February 1981
 "All of the Lads" (McDonald and Lydon) March 1981 (als 4" Be 2")
 "We'll Be There" (McDonald and Lydon) May 1981 (as Rabbie Burns + the Ticket Touts)
 "The Slow Removal of Vincent van Gogh's Left Ear" (Charly) October 1982
 "Dracs Back" (Magnet, re-released 1983 by Charly) 1982 (as Red Lipstique)
 "Oscar Wilde" (Charly) 1983 (as Red Lipstique)
 "Horror Movies" (Charly) March 1983 (as the B.B.s)
 "Are You Durty" (Charly) 1983 (as Jock McDonald's Indecent Exposure Show)
 "God Save the Queen" (Charly) July 1983 (as Michael Fagan and the Bollock Brothers)
 "Shame, Shame, Shame" (Charly Disco International) October 1983 (as Red Lipstique)
 "The Prince and the Showgirl" (InDisc) October 1984
 "Legend of the Snake" (Charly/Green Line) 1985 (as the Famous B. Brothers)
 "Dracs Back" (Charly) 1986 (as the Famous Bollock Brothers)
 "Faith Healer" (Charly) 1986 (as the Bollock Brothers)
 "Return of the Vampyre" (McDonald Bros Corp) 1986 (split 12" single with Sex Pistol])
 "Harley David (Play It Again Sam)" January 1987
 "God Created Woman" (Blue Turtle) January 1988
 "Brigitte Bardot" (Blue Turtle) January 1988
 "Don't Call Us, We Call You" (SPV) May 1992
 "My Way" (GUN) 1995
 "Where Is My Girl" (GUN) 1996
 "Cyber Polaroid" (MBC, mail order only) October 2005 (as the Bollock Brothers feat. Lolita)
 "The French Connection" feat. Le Hand of Le Frog (MBC) 2010

Compilation albums
 D Wing (UD, Japanese Bootleg) 1981 (as 4" Be 2")
 Bollock Brothers, Bollock Sisters (Konexion Records) 1986
 '77-'78-'79 (MBC Records) 1986
 Family Album (MBC Records) November 1986 (as The Lydons and The O'Donnells)
 14 Carat Gold - The Best Of The Bollock Brothers (SPV Records) May 1993
 The Best Of The Bollocks (Charly Schallplatten) 1994
 Dancin' Masters (Past & Present) (MBC Records) 1994
 The Sex Pistols Vs. The Bollock Brothers (MBC Records) 1996 (split CD with Sex Pistols)
 What A Load Of Bollocks! (MBC Records) January 2000
 25th Anniversary (MBC Records) August 2001
 Jesus Lives (MBC Records) October 2001
 Twice The Balls (Recall Records) August 2002
 Ladykillers (MBC Records) March 2007

VHS videos
 Home Video (MBC Films) 1986
 Live In Europe (MBC Films) 1987
 Home Video & Live In Europe 2xVHS Boxset (MBC Films)

The current members are Jock McDonald (vocals), Chris McKelvey (guitar), Richard Collins (bass), Klaus Fiehe, Patrick Pattyn (drums) Ciaran Crossan (guitar) and Morgan Michaux (keyboard). 

Their album Last Will & Testament (2009) is dedicated to their longtime keyboard player "Big Mark" Humphries, who died on 31 March 2008.

References

Bibliography
Further reading:

External links
AllMusic listing
YouTube videos
Trouser Press article

English punk rock groups
Musical groups established in 1979